For other automobile manufacturing related lists, see See also
   
This is a list of current automobile marques that have articles on Wikipedia, arranged in alphabetical order. The year of foundation is shown in brackets.

A 

Abarth (1949)
AC (1901)
Acura (1986)
Aeolus (2009)
Aiways (2017)
Aito (see Seres) (2016)
Aixam (1983)
Alfa Romeo (1910)
Almac (1985)
Alpina (1965)
Alpine (1955)
Alternative Cars (1984)
AM General  (1954)
Anteros (2005)
Apex (2018)
Apollo (2004)
Aptera (2005)
Arash (2006)
Arcimoto (2007)
Arcfox (2017)
Ariel (2001)
Arrinera (2008)
Artega (2006)
Aspid (2003)
Aston Martin (1913)
Audi (1932)

B 

BAIC (1988)
Bajaj (1930s)
Baojun (2002)
BAW (1953)
Bentley (1919)
Bestune (2006)
BMW (1916)
Bolloré (1822)
Bolwell (2009)
BAC (2009)
Brilliance (1992)
Buddy (1991)
Bufori (1986)
Bugatti (1909)
Buick (1903)
BYD (2003)

C 

Cadillac (1902)
Callaway (1977)
Carver (1994)
Caterham (1973)
Chamonix (1987)
Chang'an (1862)
Changfeng (1950)
Changhe (1970)
Chery (1997)
Chevrolet (1911)
Chrysler (1925)
Citroën (1919)
Ciwei (2018)
CUPRA (1985/2018)
Czinger (2019)

D 

Dacia (1966)
Daihatsu (1951)
David Brown (2013)
Dax (1968)
De la Chapelle (1970s)
De Tomaso (1959)
DeLorean (1975)
Denza (2010)
Detroit Electric (1907)
Dodge (1900)
Dongfeng (1969)
Donkervoort (1978)
DR (2006)
DS (2015)
Dynasty (1998)

E 

Electric Raceabout (2009)
Elfin (1957)
Elio (2009)
Englon (2010)
Enranger (see Weichai) (2013)
Enovate (2015)
Esemka (2007)
Etox (2006)
Equus (2009)
Everus (2008)

F 

Faraday Future (2014)
FAW (1953)
Ferrari (1939)
Fiat (1899)
Fiat Professional (2007)
Fisker (2016)
Foday (1988)
Force (1958)
Ford (1903) 
Foton (1996)
Fraser (1988)

G 

GAC (1955)
GAZ (1932)
Geely (1986)
GEM (1992)
Genesis (2015)
Geometry (2019)
Gibbs (2012)
Gillet (1992)
Ginetta (1958)
GMC (1911)
Great Wall (1984)
GTA (2005)

H 

Haval (2013)
Hawtai (2000)
Hengchi (2020)
Honda (1946)
Hongqi (1958)
Hozon (2014)
Hulas Motors (1996)
Hycan (2019)
Hyundai (1967)

I 

IKCO (1962)
Infiniti (1989)
Intermeccanica (1959)
Isdera (1969)
Isuzu (1916)
Iveco Bus (1975)

J 

JAC (1964)
Jaguar (1922)
Jeep (1941)
Jetta (2019)
Jinbei (1991)
JMC (1993)

K 

Kaipan (1991)
Kantanka (1994)
Karma (2014)
Karry (2009)
Kia (1944)
Kiira (2014)
Koenigsegg (1994)
KTM (1992)

L 

Lada (1966)
Lamborghini (1963)
Lancia (1906)
Land Rover (1948)
Landwind (2004)
Laraki (1999)
Leapmotor (2015)
LEVC (2013)
Levdeo (2008)
Lexus (1989)
Li Auto (2015)
Lifan (1992)
Lightning (2007)
Lincoln (1917)
Lister (1954)
Lotus (1952)
Lucid (2007)
Luxgen (2009)
Lynk & Co (2016)

M 

Mahindra (1945)
Maple (2000)
Maruti Suzuki (1981)
Maserati (1914)
Maxus (2011)
Mazda (1920)
McLaren (1989)
Mega (1989)
Mercedes-AMG (1967)
Mercedes-Benz (1926)
Mercedes-Maybach (1909)
MG (1924)
Micro (1995)
Mini (1969)
Mitsubishi (1870)
Mitsuoka (1968)
Mobius (2010)
Morgan (1910)

N 

Neta (see Hozon) (2014)
NEVS (2012)
Nikola (2012)
Nio (2014)
Nismo (1984)
Nissan (1933)
Noble (1999)

O 

Opel (1862)
Ora (2018)

P 

Pagani (1992)
PAL-V (2001)
Panoz (1989)
Pars Khodro (1967)
Perodua (1993)
Peugeot (1889)
Pininfarina (2018)
Polaris (1954)
Polestar (1996)
Porsche (1931)
Praga (1907)
Proton (1983)

Q 

Qoros (2007)
Quant (2015)

R 

Radical (1997)
Ranz (2013)
Renault (1899)
Renault Samsung (1994)
Rimac (2009)
Rinspeed (1979)
Rivian (2009)
Rezvani (2014)
Roding (2008)
Roewe (2006)
Rolls-Royce (1906)
Ronart (1984)
Ronn (2007)
Ruf (1939)

S 

SAIPA (1966)
Saker (1989)
Saleen (1983)
SEAT (1950)
Sehol (2018)
Seres (2016)
Skyworth (2017)
SIN (2012) 
SiTech (2018)
Škoda (1895)
Shelby  (1962)
Sono (2012)
smart (1994)
Soueast (1995)
Spyker (1999)
SsangYong (1954)
SSC (1999)
Subaru (1953)
Superformance (1996)
Suzuki (1909)

T 

Tata (1945)
Tesla (2003)
Thai Rung (1967)
Tiger (1989)
TOGG (2018)
Toyota (1937)
Tramontana (2007)
Trion (2012)
Tushek&Spigel (2012)
TVR (1947)

U 

UAZ (1941)
Ultima (1992)
Uniti (2016)

V 

Vauxhall Motors (1857)
Vega (2013)
Vencer (2010)
Venturi (1984)
VGV (see Weichai) (2019)
VinFast (2017)
Volkswagen (1937)
Volvo (1927)
Voyah (2020)
VUHL (2010)

W 

W Motors (2012)
Wallyscar (2007)
WaterCar (1999)
Weineck (1953)
Weltmeister (2015)
Westfield (1982)
Wey (2016)
Wheego (2009)
Wiesmann (1988)
Wuling (2002)

X 

XPeng (2014)

Y 

Yudo (2017)

Z 

Zamyad (1963)
Zedriv (2017)
Zeekr (2021)
Zenos Cars (2012)
Zenvo (2004)
Zhidou (see Geely) (2014)
ZX (1999)

Tuning marques

9

9ff (2001)

A

AC Schnitzer (1987)
Autech (1986)

B

Brabus (1977)

C

Carlsson (1989)
Carly (1979)

E

Eibach (1951)

G

Galpin (1946)
Gemballa (1981)
Gordini (1946)
G-Power (1971)
Gazoo Racing (2007)

H

HPD (1993)
HSV (2017)
Holden Special Vehicles (1987)

K

Kleemann (1985)
Koenig (1977)

L

Lingenfelter (1973)

M

Mansory (1989)
MTM (1990)
Mugen (1973)

P

Pratt & Miller (1989)
Prodrive (1984)

R

Ralliart (1984)
RE Amemiya (1974)
Renntech (1989)
RTR (1999)

S

Sauber (1970)
Spiess (1972)
Steinmetz (1993)
STILLEN (1986)
Studie (1995)

T

TRD (1954)

W

WCC (1994)

Automotive parts suppliers

A

AC Propulsion (1992)
Automotive Lighting (1999)

B

BBS (1970)
Bilstein (1873)
Bosch (1886)

C

Comau (1973)

D

Dinan (1979)

Delco (1909)

E

Factory Five (1995)

H

Hoesch (1871)
HKS (1973)

I

Impul (1980)
Intrepid (1991)

L

Locust
Loremo (2000)

M

Magna (1957)
Magneti Marelli (1919)
Mazel(1987)
Mecachrome (1937)
Mopar (1937)
Motrio (1998)
Multimatic (1984)

N

nanoFlowcell (2013)
Napier (1990)
Novitec (1989)

R

Rieter (1795)

P

Paxton (1937)

T

ThyssenKrupp (1999)

V

VDL (1953)
VeilSide (1990)

W

Weber (1923)

Contract manufacturers & Manufacturing subsidiaries

E

EDAG (1969)

M

Magna (1957)
Magna Steyr (2001)
MCA (1969)
Mopar (1937)
Motrio (1998)

V

Valmet (1968)
VDL (1953)
VDL Nedcar (1967)

Automotive design & coachbuilding

Castagna (1849)
Dallara (1972)
Fisher Body (1908)
Ghia (1916)
Italdesign Giugiaro (1968)
MOMO (1964)
PPI (2004)
Rometsch (1924)
Tatuus (1980)
Vandenbrink (2006)
Zagato (1919)

Dealerships, Fleet Management, Leasing Marques, Rental Companies & Automobile auctions

A

ALD (1946)

C

Cooper

Alliances

G

GENIVI, now called COVESA (2009)
BMW (1916)
MINI (1969)
Hyundai Motor Company (1967)
Kia (1944)
Mercedes-AMG (1967)
Mercedes-Benz (1926)
Mercedes-Maybach (1909)
smart (1994)
Nissan (1933)
Infiniti (1989)
Datsun (1931)
Citrus fruit (1919)
DS (1955)
Opel (1862)
Peugeot (1889)
Vauxhall (1857)
Renault (1899)
Dacia (1966)
Alpine (1955)
Lada (1963)
Maxus (2011)
Roewe (2006)
MG (1924)
Nanjing (1947)

O

OAA (2014)
Abarth 1949)
Acura (1986)
Alfa Romeo (1910)
Audi (1932)
Bentley (1919)
Borgward (1905)
Buick (1903)
Cadillac (1902)
Chevrolet (1911)
Chrysler (1925)
Citroën (1919)
Dacia (1966)
Dodge (1900)
DS (1955)
Fiat (1899)
Ford (1903)
Genesis (2015)
GMC (1911)
Holden (1856)
Honda (1946)
Hyundai (1967)
Infiniti (1989)
Iveco (1975)
Jaguar (1933)
Jeep (1941)
Karma (2014)
Kia (1944)
Koenigsegg (1994)
Lada (1963)
Lamborghini (1963)
Land Rover (1948)
Lifan (1992)
Lincoln (1917)
Mahindra (1945)
Maruti Suzuki (1981)
Maserati (1914)
Mazda (1920)
Mercedes-Benz (1926)
Mitsubishi (1970)
Nissan (1933)
Opel (1862)
Peugeot (1889)
RAM (2010)
Renault (1899)
Renault Samsung (1994)
SEAT (1950)
Škoda (1895)
smart (1994)
SsangYong (1954)
Subaru (1953)
Suzuki (1909)
Tata (1945)
Toyota (1937)
Vauxhall (1857)
Volkswagen (1937)
Volvo (1927)

R

Renault-Nissan-Mitsubishi (1999)
Renault (1899)
Dacia (1966)
Alpine (1955)
Renault Samsung (1994)
Nissan (1933)
Infiniti (1989)
Datsun (1931)

See also

List of automobile manufacturers
List of automobile marques
List of current automobile manufacturers by country
Timeline of motor vehicle brands
Automotive industry in the United Kingdom
List of car manufacturers of the United Kingdom
List of Asian automobile manufacturers
List of Eastern European automobiles
List of Western European automobile manufacturers

References

 Current (alphabetical)
 Current (alphabetical)